HMS Pearl may refer to the following ships of the Royal Navy:

, a fifth rate of 42 guns launched in 1708; a detachment of its crew under Lieutenant Robert Maynard killed Blackbeard in 1718; broken up in 1722
, a fourth rate of 42 guns launched in 1726 and sold in 1744
, a fifth rate of 44 guns launched in 1744 and sold in 1759
, a fifth rate of 32 guns launched in 1762, renamed Prothee in 1825, and sold in 1832. 
, a sloop of 20 guns launched in 1828
, a corvette of 21 guns launched in 1855
, a  launched in 1890 and sold for scrap in 1906

See also
 Pearl (disambiguation), for other ships of this name

Royal Navy ship names